Asanoa endophytica is a Gram-positive and non-motile bacterium from the genus Asanoa which has been isolated from the rhizome of the plant Boesenbergia rotunda.

References

External links
Type strain of Asanoa endophytica at BacDive -  the Bacterial Diversity Metadatabase

Micromonosporaceae
Bacteria described in 2016